Dundalk is the county town of County Louth, Ireland.

Dundalk may also refer to:

Places
Dundalk (barony), a former barony in County Louth, Ireland; see Ulaid
Dundalk Lower
Dundalk Upper
Dundalk (Parliament of Ireland constituency)
Dundalk (UK Parliament constituency)
Dundalk, Maryland, United States of America
Dundalk, Ontario, Canada
Dundalk Bay, Ireland
Dundalk railway station

Sports clubs
 Dundalk Bulls, ice hockey
 Dundalk F.C., football
 Dundalk R.F.C, rugby union